Round Mountain is a town located in north-eastern New South Wales, Australia, in the Tweed Shire.

Demographics

The median age was 47, 9 years above the national median of 38.

81.8% of people living in Round Mountain were born in Australia. The other top responses for country of birth were England 7.0%, New Zealand 2.1% and Scotland 2.1%.

94.3% of people spoke only English at home. There were no other responses for language spoken at home.

References 

Suburbs of Tweed Heads, New South Wales